Yussif Issaka Jajah is a Ghanaian politician and member of the Seventh Parliament of the Fourth Republic of Ghana representing the Ayawaso North Constituency in the Greater Accra Region on the ticket of the National Democratic Congress.

Career
He was a Research Fellow at the Inter- Ministerial Coordinating Committee on Decentralization in Accra from 2013 to 2016. He was also a Consultant of Oil and Gas from 2011 to 2012 and MDPI and Goodwill International.

Early life and education
He was born on 21 October 1979 and hails from Bole in the Savannah region of Ghana. He had his MBA in International Oil and Gas Management from the University of Dundee in Scotland, UK in 2011. He also had his BSc in Accounting from UPSA in 2009. He also graduated from the Institute of Chartered Accountants in Ghana.

Politics 
He is a member of the National Democratic Congress. He is the member of parliament for Ayawaso-North Constituency in Greater Accra region of Ghana.

Personal life
Yussif is a Muslim. He is married with two children.

References

Ghanaian MPs 2017–2021
1979 births
Living people
Ghanaian Muslims
Alumni of the University of Dundee
National Democratic Congress (Ghana) politicians
University of Professional Studies alumni